The fimbrial usher protein is involved in biogenesis of the pilus in Gram-negative bacteria. The biogenesis of some fimbriae (or pili) requires a two-component assembly and transport system which is composed of a periplasmic chaperone and a pore-forming outer membrane protein which has been termed a molecular 'usher'; this is the chaperone-usher pathway.

The usher protein has a molecular weight ranging from 86 to 100 kDa and is composed of a membrane-spanning 24-stranded beta barrel domain, reminiscent of porins, and of four periplasmic soluble domains: an N-terminal one of about 120 residues (NTD), a 'middle' domain of about 80 residues located as a soluble insertion within the beta barrel region of the sequence (plug domain) and two IG-like domains (each about 80 residues long) at the C-terminus (CTD1 and CTD2). Although the degree of sequence similarity of these proteins is not very high they share a number of characteristics. One of these is the presence of two pairs of disulfide bond-forming cysteines, the first one located in the NTD and the second in CTD2. The best conserved region of the sequence corresponds to the plug domain.

References

Protein domains
Protein families
Outer membrane proteins